Colin Percy Campbell (July 3, 1877May 18, 1956) was the Speaker of the Michigan House of Representatives from 1909 to 1910.

Early life
Campbell was born on July 3, 1877, in Walker Townnship, Michigan to parents John C. and Martha E. Campbell. Campbell was of Scottish ancestry. He attended Albion College and graduated from the University of Michigan.

Career
Campbell was a lawyer. He served as a Republican member of the Michigan House of Representatives from the Kent County 3rd district for a single term in 1909 and  1910. Campbell was defeated for re-election in 1910. During his term in the office, he served as the Speaker of the Michigan House of Representatives.

Personal life
Campbell married Irene Jane Bowers on July 14, 1897. He was widowed upon her death on June 8, 1916. Campbell remarried on July 2, 1919 to Millie Barnes.

Death
Campbell died on May 18, 1956. He is interred at Greenwood Cemetery in Grand Rapids, Michigan.

References

1877 births
1956 deaths
Michigan lawyers
Speakers of the Michigan House of Representatives
Republican Party members of the Michigan House of Representatives
Albion College alumni
Burials in Michigan
University of Michigan alumni
20th-century American politicians
20th-century American lawyers